The terms clown face and clownface can refer to:
specifically, the design and facial characteristics unique to a given clown
generally, the make-up and costuming of a clown, as in "Bubbles arrived first, in clownface, and ready to greet the crowd"
rarely, the term clownface is used synonymously with clown white, the white foundation makeup of a whiteface clown.